Beija Sapo is a Brazilian blind-date television show produced and broadcast by MTV Brasil and hosted by the Brazilian model Daniella Cicarelli.

The title means "kissing toads" in Portuguese.

In the show, a participant called the prince or princess must choose one out of three contestants, completely dressed up as toads, to kiss them at the end of the program. The program's scenario resembles a medieval castle, in order to give a fairy tale atmosphere to it.

The whole choosing process includes getting to know the "toads"' bedrooms, presented by close friends of theirs, asking the "toads" several questions, and even getting them to sing the "prince" or "princess" a song, with new lyrics written by themselves, often begging them a chance. The chosen "toad" will eventually become a "prince/ss" as well, and the show ends as the final kiss happens.

The dismissed contestants still have the opportunity of kissing someone else. Right after their dismissal, Daniella Cicarelli picks out some people from the audience, so that the one who screams the sentence "Help me out, Cicarelli!!" louder will be able to kiss the eliminated "toad".

There has been also several lesbian and gay special editions, making it the first TV show ever in Brazilian terrestrial television to broadcast a gay kiss before 8pm, that is, on a timeslot rated appropriate for children and teenagers by the Brazilian Ministry of Justice.

Beija Sapo airs every Fridays, at 7:00pm, on MTV Brasil.
It's the highest-rated show on the channel and was made to replace Fica Comigo (which was the highest-rated show on the channel before Beija Sapo).

See also
 MTV Brasil
 Daniella Cicarelli

References

External links
 Official website

Brazilian reality television series
Portuguese-language television shows
2005 Brazilian television series debuts
2007 Brazilian television series endings